George Bryant Campion (1795–1870) was an English watercolour landscape painter.

Life 
Campion was one of the earliest members of the New Society of Painters in Water Colours, having been elected in 1837, and was a frequent contributor to the exhibitions of that society. Olden Times and Gathering Orach, both exhibited at the Institute of Painters in Water Colours (as the Society was renamed in 1863) in 1869, are fair specimens of his art. He was for some time drawing master at the Military Academy, Woolwich. Although many sites say that George Bryant Campion retired and died in Munich, he died on 1 April 1870 at Woolwich, UK.  Another common mistake is that he was the author of "The Adventures of a Chamois Hunter".

References
 Millar, Delia (2004). "Campion, George Bryant (1795–1870), watercolour painter". In Oxford Dictionary of National Biography. Oxford University Press.
 Oliver, Valerie Cassel, ed. (2011). "Campion, George Bryant". In Benezit Dictionary of Artists. Oxford Art Online. Oxford University Press.
 

1795 births
1870 deaths
English landscape painters
English watercolourists
Place of birth missing